Braintree District Council in Essex, England is elected every four years. Since the last boundary changes in 2015, 49 councillors have been elected from 26 wards.

Political control
Since the first election to the council in 1973 political control of the council has been held by the following parties:

Seat history

Leadership
The leaders of the council since 1995 have been:

Council elections
1973 Braintree District Council election
1976 Braintree District Council election
1979 Braintree District Council election (New ward boundaries)
1983 Braintree District Council election
1987 Braintree District Council election (District boundary changes took place but the number of seats remained the same)
1991 Braintree District Council election (District boundary changes took place but the number of seats remained the same)
1995 Braintree District Council election
1999 Braintree District Council election
2003 Braintree District Council election (New ward boundaries)
2007 Braintree District Council election
2011 Braintree District Council election
2015 Braintree District Council election (New ward boundaries)
2019 Braintree District Council election (Ward boundary changes took place but the number of seats remained the same)

Changes between elections

1995–1999

1999–2003

2003–2007

2007–2011

2015–2019

References

By-election results

Notes

External links
Braintree District Council

 
Braintree District
Council elections in Essex